Alexei Alexeyevich Abrikosov (June 25, 1928 – March 29, 2017) was a Soviet, Russian and American theoretical physicist whose main contributions are in the field of condensed matter physics. He was the co-recipient of the 2003 Nobel Prize in Physics, with Vitaly Ginzburg and Anthony James Leggett, for theories about how matter can behave at extremely low temperatures.

Education and early life 

Abrikosov was born in Moscow, Russian SFSR, Soviet Union, on June 25, 1928, to a couple of physicians: Aleksey Abrikosov and Fani Abrikosova, née Wulf. He graduated from Moscow State University in 1948. From 1948 to 1965, he worked at the Institute for Physical Problems of the USSR Academy of Sciences, where he received his Ph.D. in 1951 for the theory of thermal diffusion in plasmas, and then his Doctor of Physical and Mathematical Sciences (a "higher doctorate") degree in 1955 for a thesis on quantum electrodynamics at high energies. Abrikosov moved to the US in 1991, and lived there until his death in 2017, in Palo Alto, California. While in the US, Abrikosov was elected to the National Academy of Sciences in 2000, and in 2001, to be a foreign member of the Royal Society.

Career
From 1965 to 1988, he worked at the Landau Institute for Theoretical Physics (USSR Academy of Sciences). He has been a professor at Moscow State University since 1965. In addition, he held tenure at the Moscow Institute of Physics and Technology from 1972 to 1976, and at the Moscow Institute of Steel and Alloys from 1976 to 1991. He served as a full member of the USSR Academy of Sciences from 1987 to 1991. In 1991, he became a full member of the Russian Academy of Sciences.

In two works in 1952 and 1957, Abrikosov explained how magnetic flux can penetrate a class of superconductors. This class of materials are called type-II superconductors. The accompanying arrangement of magnetic flux lines is called the Abrikosov vortex lattice.

Together with Lev Gor'kov and Igor Dzyaloshinskii, Abrikosov has written an iconic book on theoretical solid-state physics, which has been used to train physicists in the field for decades. 

From 1991 until his retirement, he worked at Argonne National Laboratory in the U.S. state of Illinois. Abrikosov was an Argonne Distinguished Scientist at the Condensed Matter Theory Group in Argonne's Materials Science Division. When he received the Nobel Prize, his research was focused on the origins of magnetoresistance, a property of some materials that change their resistance to electrical flow under the influence of a magnetic field.

Honours and awards 
Abrikosov was awarded the Lenin Prize in 1966, the Fritz London Memorial Prize in 1972, and the USSR State Prize in 1982. In 1989 he received the Landau Prize from the Academy of Sciences, Russia. Two years later, in 1991, Abrikosov was awarded the Sony Corporation's John Bardeen Award. The same year he was elected a Foreign Honorary Member of the American Academy of Arts and Sciences. He shared the 2003 Nobel Prize in Physics. He was also a member of the Royal Academy of London, a fellow of the American Physical Society, and in 2000 was elected to the prestigious National Academy of Sciences. Other awards include:

 Member of the Academy of Sciences of the USSR (now Russian Academy of Sciences), 1964
 Honorary Doctor of the University of Lausanne, 1975
 Order of the Badge of Honour, 1975
 Order of the Red Banner of Labour, 1988
 Academician of the Academy of Sciences of the USSR (now Russian Academy of Sciences), 1987
 Elected a Foreign Member of the Royal Society (ForMemRS) in 2001
 Golden Plate Award of the American Academy of Achievement, 2004
 Gold Medal of Vernadsky from National Academy of Sciences of Ukraine, 2015

Personal life
Abrikosov was the son of the physicians Alexei Ivanovich Abrikosov (1875-1955) and his second wife, Fania Davidovna Woolf (1895—1965). Through his father, Abrikosov was the nephew of the martyred Catholic nun Anna Abrikosova (1882-1936).

His sister was Maria Alekseevna Abrikósova (1929-1998), physician.

He married Svetlana Yuriyevna Bunkova and had 3 children.

He died in California on 29 March 2017 at the age of 88.

Books

References

External links

 including the Nobel Lecture on December 8, 2003 Type II Superconductors and the Vortex Lattice
M. R. Norman, "Aleksei A. Abrikosov", Biographical Memoirs of the National Academy of Sciences (2018)

1928 births
2017 deaths
Nobel laureates in Physics
American Nobel laureates
Russian Nobel laureates
Members of the United States National Academy of Sciences
Foreign Members of the Royal Society
Russian Jews
Jewish American physicists
Full Members of the USSR Academy of Sciences
Full Members of the Russian Academy of Sciences
Moscow State University alumni
Academic staff of Moscow State University
Academic staff of the Moscow Institute of Physics and Technology
Lenin Prize winners
Recipients of the Order of the Red Banner of Labour
Recipients of the USSR State Prize
Jewish Russian physicists
Soviet physicists
Superconductivity
Fellows of the American Academy of Arts and Sciences
Fellows of the American Physical Society
Theoretical physicists
Soviet Jews